The Brazilian municipal elections of 2012 took place on October 7 and on October 28 (for cities with more than 200,000 voters, where the second round is available). Over 138 million voters chose mayors, deputy mayors and city councillors for the 5,568 municipalities of Brazil. These were the first elections in which the recently registered parties Partido Pátria Livre (PPL) and Partido Social Democrático (PSD) participated; they were both recognized by the Superior Electoral Court (Tribunal Superior Eleitoral – TSE) in 2011. Political parties whose candidates wished to run for the 2012 elections had to be registered at the TSE for at least one year before the election date, while candidates also had to be affiliated to a party for the same period of time. Conventions for the selection of candidates within the parties occurred between 10 and 30 June, while the registry of candidates and alliances with the Regional Electoral Courts (Tribunais Regionais Eleitorais – TREs) took place until July 5. Electoral campaign was authorized from the moment a candidacy had been registered. The free electoral program (propaganda eleitoral gratuita) – two daily slots on free-to-air TV and radio for political advertising paid by the Electoral Justice fund – ran weekdays from 21 August until 4 October. According to the current Brazilian electoral law, the two-round system – should the leading candidate receive less than 50% +1 of the votes – is only available for cities with more than 200,000 voters. This includes all state capitals, with the exception of Boa Vista, Roraima and Palmas, Tocantins, plus 59 other municipalities. The free electoral program for the second round ran from 13 October until 26 October.

Below is a list of the cities where the runoff took place (bold denote state capitals). These cities are home to 31 725 967 of the country's total constituency of 140 646 446 registered electors; that is, 22.56% of Brazilian voters went to the polling stations on October 28.

Belém, Pará
Belford Roxo, Rio de Janeiro
Blumenau, Santa Catarina
Campina Grande, Paraíba
Campinas, São Paulo
Campo Grande, Mato Grosso do Sul
Cariacica, Espírito Santo
Cascavel, Paraná
Contagem, Minas Gerais
Cuiabá, Mato Grosso
Curitiba, Paraná
Diadema, São Paulo
Duque de Caxias, Rio de Janeiro
Florianópolis, Santa Catarina
Fortaleza, Ceará
Franca, São Paulo
Guarujá, São Paulo
Guarulhos, São Paulo
João Pessoa, Paraíba
Joinville, Santa Catarina
Juiz de Fora, Minas Gerais
Jundiaí, São Paulo
Londrina, Paraná
Macapá, Amapá
Manaus, Amazonas
Maringá, Paraná
Mauá, São Paulo
Montes Claros, Minas Gerais
Natal, Rio Grande do Norte
Niterói, Rio de Janeiro
Nova Iguaçu, Rio de Janeiro
Pelotas, Rio Grande do Sul
Petrópolis, Rio de Janeiro
Ponta Grossa, Paraná
Porto Velho, Rondônia
Ribeirão Preto, São Paulo
Santo André, São Paulo
Rio Branco, Acre
Salvador, Bahia
São Gonçalo, Rio de Janeiro
São Luís, Maranhão
São Paulo, São Paulo
Sorocaba, São Paulo
Taubaté, São Paulo
Teresina, Piauí
Uberaba, Minas Gerais
Vila Velha, Espírito Santo
Vitória, Espírito Santo
Vitória da Conquista, Bahia
Volta Redonda, Rio de Janeiro

Election results
The following tables' contents can also be found at the Superior Electoral Court website.

Mayoral elections

City councillors' elections

See also
2012 Goiânia mayoral election

References

2012 elections in Brazil
Municipal elections in Brazil
October 2012 events in South America